"Give Me You" is a song by Canadian recording artist Tamia. It was written and produced by Claude Kelly and Andre Brissett for her fifth studio album Beautiful Surprise (2012). Released as the album's second and final single in the United States, it reached number 19 on the US Billboard Adult R&B Songs chart.

Track listing
Digital download
 "Give Me You" – 3:34

Credits and personnel 
Credits adapted from the liner notes of Beautiful Surprise.

Andre Brissett – production, writer
Ben Chang – engineering
Tamia Hill – backing vocals, lead vocals
Claude Kelly – production, writer
Manny Marroquin – mixing
Conrad "Connie" Martin – engineering assistance

Charts

References

2012 singles
2012 songs
Tamia songs
Music videos directed by Aaron A
Song recordings produced by Salaam Remi
Songs written by Claude Kelly